Neulliac is a commune in the Morbihan department of Brittany in north-western France. Inhabitants of Neulliac are called Neulliacois.

See also
Communes of the Morbihan department

References

External links

Communes of Morbihan